13's Reborn is the debut album released by Girugamesh on September 27, 2006.

Track listing 

* Not on the Limited edition.

Notes 
All tracks arranged by Girugamesh except for track 7 which was arranged by Sakura

Personnel 
Satoshi – vocals
Shuu – bass
Nii – guitar
Ryo – drums

2006 debut albums
Girugamesh albums
Japanese-language albums